Glenview is a suburb in southern Hamilton in New Zealand. It was named by Bruce Lugton of developers Lugton Lands. He chose Glenview because he felt it depicted the area perfectly. It was defined as a suburb in 1963. 

Glenview was the site of New Zealand's first shopping mall in 1969, grocer Erwin Leonard Guy Abel's Big A Plaza. Today Glenview has a small shopping centre and Resthills Park.

Demographics

Glenview had a population of 4,722 at the 2018 New Zealand census, an increase of 546 people (13.1%) since the 2013 census, and an increase of 651 people (16.0%) since the 2006 census. There were 1,620 households, comprising 2,292 males and 2,430 females, giving a sex ratio of 0.94 males per female, with 1,059 people (22.4%) aged under 15 years, 1,080 (22.9%) aged 15 to 29, 1,983 (42.0%) aged 30 to 64, and 594 (12.6%) aged 65 or older.

Ethnicities were 68.4% European/Pākehā, 23.8% Māori, 5.1% Pacific peoples, 18.1% Asian, and 3.1% other ethnicities. People may identify with more than one ethnicity.

The percentage of people born overseas was 25.4, compared with 27.1% nationally.

Although some people chose not to answer the census's question about religious affiliation, 43.9% had no religion, 38.8% were Christian, 1.0% had Māori religious beliefs, 4.5% were Hindu, 1.3% were Muslim, 1.1% were Buddhist and 3.2% had other religions.

Of those at least 15 years old, 819 (22.4%) people had a bachelor's or higher degree, and 588 (16.1%) people had no formal qualifications. 504 people (13.8%) earned over $70,000 compared to 17.2% nationally. The employment status of those at least 15 was that 1,911 (52.2%) people were employed full-time, 486 (13.3%) were part-time, and 186 (5.1%) were unemployed.

Education

See also 
 List of streets in Hamilton
Suburbs of Hamilton, New Zealand

References

Suburbs of Hamilton, New Zealand